Yango is a ride-hailing, delivery and e-grocery service operating in Europe, Africa, the Middle East and South America and available via a mobile app. It is operated by Netherlands-based company in most of countries or by local companies in some of them. As of 2021, service operates in the Ivory Coast, Ghana, Finland, Cameroon, Senegal, Norway, Zambia, Angola, Algeria, Mozambique, United Emirates, Bolivia and more.

Service features its own smart mapping, routing, and navigation technologies and harnesses machine learning for its order distribution system. This combination shortens the time drivers spend looking for passengers, picking them up, and dropping them off. 

These technologies significantly reduce the net cost of the trip and the time that a driver spends seeking a customer, heading to the next customer, or driving a customer to his/her destination. Yango’s efficient routing and similar technologies ensure efficient use of drivers’ time while providing predictable and affordable service to riders.

History 

Yango's beta app was launched on October 4, 2018, at Abidjan (Ivory Coast) in French. On November 9, 2018, it was launched in Finland. In addition to Helsinki, as of December 2020 Yango operates in Tampere and Turku. 

Yango was officially launched in Israel on December 10, 2018. The   app was installed by 100,000 users there in the first two weeks. The firm introduced a controversial new business model in the local taxi sector that offered passengers the exact price of rides known in advance. This fixed-price feature has drawn scrutiny from the Israeli Ministry of Transportation because it may violate Israeli law, which mandates that cab drivers can only charge the price indicated by the meter. 

In March 2020, Yango announced that it would offer the option of working directly with the company to independent licensed taxi drivers, after previously working with drivers only through taxi companies. 

Yango launched in Accra, Ghana in June 2019 with plans to expand to other parts of the country.

In July 2021, Yango launched in Oslo, Norway. As of November 2021 the service has expanded and is available in Bergen.

The service continued to expand in Africa and in November 2021 launched in Douala and Yaounde, Cameroon.

In November 2021 street-hailing drivers of Cote d’Ivoire organized strikes against Yango blaming the company to be working with VTC drivers, which has been outside the scope of the current legislation in the country. This lead to establishment of a working group on upgrading the transport law by the Ministry of Transport. Later the VTC concept had been introduced to the legislation, providing Yango and other ride-hailing services in the market with opportunity to obtain temporary licences.

In December 2021, Yango launched its app in Dakar, Senegal and opened a center for its partner-drivers in the city. 

In March 2022, Yango became available in Lusaka, Zambia.

In 2022, the company closed express delivery services for groceries in Britain and France.

In August 2022, Yango started its operations in La Paz, Bolivia.

In October 2022, Yango became available in Algeria.

As of 2022, service operates in the Ivory Coast, Ghana, Finland, Cameroon, Senegal, Norway, Zambia, Angola, Algeria, Mozambique, United Emirates, Bolivia and other countries.

Special features 

Yango does not have its own cars or drivers, partnering instead with local transport companies and drivers. In countries where the company operates, its partners have opened dedicated driver’s centers.

Permissions controversy

Yango asks for permission to access certain phone features in order to tailor the user experience. In November 2018, Finland’s largest national newspaper Helsingin Sanomat recommended not to download the app due to security risks from data collection. Following an investigation, the Finnish Communications Regulatory Authority found that Yango's terms of service were essentially the same as Uber's. Soon after, Helsingin Sanomat published a follow-up article comparing permission rights requested by various taxi applications; it placed Yango second after Uber.

See also 
 Yandex Taxi

References

External links 
 

Transport companies established in 2018
Ridesharing companies
Yandex